The Tenant of Wildfell Hall is a 1996 British television serial adaptation of Anne Brontë's 1848 novel of the same name, produced by BBC and directed by Mike Barker. The serial stars Tara Fitzgerald as Helen Graham, Rupert Graves as her abusive husband Arthur Huntington and Toby Stephens as Gilbert Markham. The first two parts aired in the United Kingdom on 17 November 1996, and the third on 24 November.

Plot summary
A mysterious young woman arrives at Wildfell Hall, an old mansion of Elizabethan era with a young son. She determines to lead an independent existence, but her new neighbours don't want to let her alone. Only one of them, a young farmer, Gilbert Markham, succeeded in revealing her secrets.
  
For a full length summary see: The Tenant of Wildfell Hall plot summary.

Cast
Toby Stephens - Gilbert Markham
Tara Fitzgerald - Helen Graham
Rupert Graves - Arthur Huntington
Sarah Badel - Rachel
Jackson Leach - Master Arthur Huntington
Sean Gallagher - Walter Hargrave
Jonathan Cake - Ralph Hattersley
Joe Absolom - Fergus Markham
Kenneth Cranham - Reverend Millward
Pam Ferris - Mrs. Markham
Cathy Murphy - Miss Myers
Paloma Baeza - Rose Markham
Aran Bell - Richard Wilson
Miranda Pleasence - Eliza Millward
James Purefoy - Frederick Lawrence
Kim Durham - Benson
Dominic Rowan - Lord Lowborough
Beatie Edney - Annabella Wilmot, Lady Lowborough
Janet Dale - Mrs. Wilson
Susannah Wise - Millicent Hargrave
Karen Westwood - Jane Wilson

Awards and nominations
BAFTA TV Awards
Won  Best Make-Up and Hair Design - Jean Speak
Nominated Best Costume Design - Rosalind Ebbutt
Nominated Best Design - Sarah Greenwood
Nominated Best Photography and Lighting (Fiction/Entertainment) - Daf Hobson
Peabody Awards - 1998
 Won - WGBH Boston and BBC
Royal Television Society Craft & Design Awards - 1997
 Won Best Camera - Drama, Entertainment & Events - Daf Hobson
 Won Best Music - Original Score - Richard G. Mitchell
 Won Best Production Design - Drama - Sarah Greenwood
 Nominated Best Team

References

External links

1996 British television series debuts
1996 British television series endings
BBC television dramas
1990s British television miniseries
1990s British drama television series
Television series set in the 1820s
Television shows based on British novels
Peabody Award-winning television programs
English-language television shows
Television shows set in Cumbria
The Tenant of Wildfell Hall